Jack Brown, better known by his stage name Wildchild, is an American rapper from Oxnard, California. He is a member of Lootpack.

Career
In 2003, Wildchild released his first solo album, Secondary Protocol, on Stones Throw Records. Produced by Madlib and Oh No, it featured guest appearances from Medaphoar, LMNO, Percee P, Planet Asia, and Aceyalone.

Personal life
Wildchild's son, Miles Brown, is an actor, dancer and rapper.

Discography

Albums
Secondary Protocol (2003)
Jack of All Trades (2007)
T.G.I.F. (Thank God It's Funky) (2014)

EPs
The Jackal (2004)

Singles
"Knicknack 2002" (2002)
"Code Red" (2003)
"Wonder Years" (2004)
"Fatherhood ft: Big Daddy Kane, Posdnuos, Stacy Epps" (2022)

Guest appearances
Quasimoto - "Discipline 99, Pt. 1" from The Unseen (2000)
Madlib - "Cut One" from Madlib Invazion (2000)
Kankick - "On the Lookout" from From Artz Unknown (2001)
BT - "Kimosabe" from Emotional Technology (2003)
Oh No - "Stomp That, V. 2" and "WTF" from The Disrupt (2004)
LMNO - "Life Is a Come Up" from Economic Food Chain Music (2004)
Madvillain - "Hardcore Hustle" from Madvillainy (2004)
Declaime - "Signs" from Conversations with Dudley (2004)
Hyper - "This Is a Warning" from We Control (2006)
Oh No - "Keep It Lit" from Exodus into Unheard Rhythms (2006)
Foreign Beggars - "Let Go" from Stray Point Agenda (2006)
Dabrye - "The Stand" from Two/Three (2006)
Pigeon John - "If You Let It" from Featuring Pigeon John 2 (2007)
Tr3s Monos - "Amor" from "¿Quién es Simone Staton?" (2007)
Metro - "Hand in Motion 1" and "Hands in Motion 2" from Hands in Motion (2008)
Eno.D + Magnificent Ruffians - "Fire" from Firewater (2009)
Jazz Liberatorz - "After Party (Jazz Lib Remix)" from Fruit of the Past (2009)
Grems - "MJC" from Sea Sex & Grems (2009)
A State of Mind - "Root to the Fruit" from Platypus Funk (2010)
Kyo Itachi - "Super Psycho" from Musikyo (2010)
B-Doub - "Playin 4 Keeps" from Food for Thought (2010)
Oh No - "Overload" from Ohnomite (2012)
Britney Spears - "When I Say So" (unreleased) from Britney (2001)

References

External links
Wildchild on Stones Throw Records

Living people
African-American male rappers
Rappers from California
Stones Throw Records artists
Place of birth missing (living people)
21st-century American rappers
21st-century American male musicians
21st-century African-American musicians
Musicians from Oxnard, California
Likwit Crew members
1973 births